Mohamed Aly Bathily is a Malian politician. He serves as the Malian Minister of State Properties, Land Affairs and Assets.

References

Living people
Government ministers of Mali
Year of birth missing (living people)
Place of birth missing (living people)
21st-century Malian people